Xinma is a railway station on the Taiwan Railways Administration Yilan line. It is located in Su'ao Township, Yilan County, Taiwan.

History
The station was opened on 22 November 1920.

A train derailment occurred near Xinma station on 21 October 2018.

Structure
Sinma Station has a simple reinforced concrete structure building. The station is staffless and managed by nearby Su'aoxin Station.

Around the station
 Wulaokeng Scenic Area

See also
 List of railway stations in Taiwan
 2018 Yilan train derailment

References

1920 establishments in Taiwan
Railway stations in Yilan County, Taiwan
Railway stations opened in 1920
Railway stations served by Taiwan Railways Administration